is an actor, writer (SuspiciousPackaging), director, producer, blogger (SUSPACK) and entrepreneur (CEO of Pacco Sospetto Brands).

Filmography
1997: Allyson Is Watching as Peter
2000: An Unkindness of Ravens as Simon Reese
2000: Big Momma's House as Jud
2000: The Ladies Man as Hugh Hefner
2001: FreakyLinks in episode "Police Siren" as Earl Woodley (TV series) 
2002: Luster as Derek

In popular culture
Sean Thibodeau appeared on the cover of a number of lifestyle and fashion magazines, as well as a number of advertising campaigns for print and television.

Sean Thibodeau was named to IMDB's list of "The 50 Hottest Actors" in 2011.

Sean Thibodeau was also named to IMDB's list of  "40 Hot Men Hollywood Should be Using More."

References

External links

American male film actors
Living people
Year of birth missing (living people)